Elk Valley is an unincorporated community in Campbell County, Tennessee, United States. It is situated at the northern end of a broad valley of the same name in the Cumberland Mountains, southwest of Jellico. Tennessee State Route 297 (Newcomb Pike) passes through the community.

Notes

Unincorporated communities in Campbell County, Tennessee
Unincorporated communities in Tennessee